Joseph Byron (January 1847 – May 28, 1923) was an English photographer who founded the Byron Company in Manhattan.

Biography
He was born in England in January 1847. His father, grandfather, and great-grandfather were photographers. He received a commission from the British government to photograph the conditions in English coal mines. He emigrated to the United States in 1888 with his children, Percy Claude Byron, Florence Mabel Byron (1880–?), and Georgina Byron (1883–?). In 1892 he opened his commercial studio in Manhattan. Byron's specialty was photographing Broadway shows and other stage productions. His son was the photographer Percy Claude Byron. Percy was "the premier maritime photographer of his generation". Joseph Byron worked for The New York Times in the 1890s. He died on May 28, 1923 in Manhattan.

Archive
22,000 photos at the Museum of the City of New York from between 1890 and 1942.

References

External links

 

1847 births
1923 deaths
The New York Times visual journalists
Artists from Nottingham
19th-century English photographers
19th-century American photographers
Photographers from Nottinghamshire
British emigrants to the United States